"You" (stylized as you) is a song by Japanese singer Koda Kumi, serving as her 19th single and the first to be released as part of her 12 Singles Collection. It became her first single to achieve the number one position on the weekly Oricon Singles Chart. As of April 2011, "you" is certified platinum for digital cellphone downloads by the RIAJ.

Background
you is Japanese singer-songwriter Kumi Koda's first single in her 12 Singles Collection. It became her second single to debut at No. 1 and first to hold the No. 1 spot for the weekly ranking on the Oricon Singles Charts. Her first the debut at the top spot was "Butterfly," but "Butterfly" had dropped to take the number-two slot for the week.

Each single in the 12 Singles Collection had unique cover art based on certain cultures in various countries. The back cover of each single was a piece to a puzzle, which could only be completed by purchasing all twelve singles. The same was done for the obi strips, which contained a full image when arranged together in order. However, the obi strip image was omitted on the Hong Kong versions. The cover for you represented the Inuit culture in Alaska. Along with differing cover art, each obi strip contained a piece of an image, which when put together in order, would reveal a full picture of Kumi. The same was done for the back covers of each single.

Composition 
"you" was composed by music composer Toru Watanabe and performed by arranger and lyricist Yoko Kuzuya, who also worked on the lyrical portion with Kumi. The song carries elements of both pop and R&B, opening strong with a piano instrumental. The single was also only one of three in the collection to garner a b-side, the others being No Regret and Someday/Boys♥Girls. The b-side for this single was "Sweet Kiss," which is an uptempo pop song. The song was composed by Atsushi Sato (known as ats-) from the Japanese pop band HΛL, who had previously worked with Kumi's label-mate Ayumi Hamasaki.

Music video 
While the music video for "you" is the first in the 12 Singles Collection, it is the second in a music video-driven story, its predecessor being "Candy," which featured rapper Mr. Blistah from Clench & Blistah.  It is also tied into three other videos: "Lies," "feel" and "Someday." 

"you" opens with three men talking about the heartbreak they had experienced in their lives and the women they were with. Each man had a passion that they followed and found a lover who shared in their interests. Each video in the music video stories focuses on one of the men at the table, with their love interests being different incarnations of Kumi.

The protagonist in "you" is played by Japanese actor Takashi Tsukamoto, whose passion is photography. He finds a lover, played by Kumi, who he believes to have "the perfect image." Throughout the video, it shows the couple starting off happy and enjoying his passion. However, the woman becomes frustrated, believing his photography to mean more to him than she does. The video is in a winter setting where Kumi walks down the street in white clothing while she is in tears over her failed relationship. Kumi sleeps in bed alone while waiting for her call from her boyfriend and when she takes down pictures of the two, he tries calling her, but Kumi hangs up on him before he can catch up with her. The video ends as we see photographs of Kumi and her boyfriend together falling from the sky before the last shot of their picture is shown. Kumi would later have a reedited version of the music video during her Live Tour 2016 ~Best Single Collection~.

Track listing
(Source)

Charts 
Oricon Sales Chart (Japan)

Alternate Version(s)
you
you: Found on the single (2005) and its corresponding album BEST ~second session~ (2006)
you [Instrumental]: Found on the single (2005)
you ~Acoustic Piano Mix~: Found on Koda Kumi Remix Album (2006)
you ~Piano Version~: Found on BEST ~BOUNCE & LOVERS~ (2006)
you [Floor on the Intelligence Remix]: Found on Koda Kumi Driving Hit's 2 (2010)
you [KOZM Remix]: Found on Koda Kumi Driving Hit's 4 (2012)

References

Avex Network (2005), Kumi Koda Official Web Site
Oricon Style (2005), Oricon Style

2005 singles
2005 songs
Koda Kumi songs
Oricon Weekly number-one singles
Rhythm Zone singles
Songs written by Koda Kumi